WJTS-CD, virtual channel 18 (UHF digital channel 24), is a low-powered YTA TV-affiliated television station licensed to Jasper, Indiana, United States. The station is owned by DC Broadcasting, and airs a mixture of family programming, local sports, public affairs and children's programming.

WJTS-CD carries sports programming such as The Outdoorsman, Purdue Express, and Inside Notre Dame Football and Basketball. In addition, the station carries over 100 high-school sporting events from area schools. The station has also aired locally produced programming, such as the Colgate Country Showdown.

The station's broadcasting facilities consist of three satellite downlink stations ("earth stations"), optical and magnetic playback facilities, and a 300-foot transmission tower.

External links
Official site
WJTS-CD program listings from TitanTV

Television stations in Indiana
Television channels and stations established in 1991
Low-power television stations in the United States
1991 establishments in Indiana
YTA TV affiliates